{{DISPLAYTITLE:C21H31NO3}}
The molecular formula C21H31NO3 (molar mass: 345.47 g/mol, exact mass: 345.2304 u) may refer to:

 Samandaridine
 Spirendolol

Molecular formulas